Rabbitt was a South African rock band from 1972 to 1978

Rabbitt may also refer to:

people with the surname Rabbitt:
Ann Rabbitt (born 1960), American civil servant and politician from New York
Eddie Rabbitt (1941–1998), American singer and songwriter
James Rabbitt (born 1941), Canadian businessman and former politician in British Columbia
Joe Rabbitt (1900–1969), American Major League Baseball player
Mary C. Rabbitt (1915–2002), American geologist
Patrick Rabbitt, English psychologist
Richard J. Rabbitt (1935–2011), American politician from Missouri 
Tim Rabbitt, Irish politician

in other uses:
Rabbitt (album) (1977), by Eddie Rabbitt

See also
Terence Rabbitts (born 1946), British molecular biologist
The Dead Rabbitts, American metal band
Rabbit (disambiguation)
Rabbitte (surname)